Many eyes may refer to:

 Linus's law, in software development
 Many eyes hypothesis, in vigilance, behavioural ecology

See also
 Five Eyes (disambiguation)
 Many-eyed snake-eel
 Many-Eyed Ones, the ophanim, a rank of angels in Abrahamic religions